Straight Ahead is the sixth studio album by Christian music artist Amy Grant, released in 1984.

Straight Ahead was the follow-up to Grant's ground-breaking 1982 album Age to Age. Containing songs that were more aggressive than the ones found on Age to Age, Straight Ahead was not as commercially successful as its predecessor. Nonetheless, it still topped Billboard's Christian album chart for 61 weeks, knocking Age to Age from the number-one position. The song "Angels" was also a No. 1 Christian radio hit for 13 weeks, and won a Grammy Award for "Best Gospel Performance, Female." Straight Ahead would be certified gold in 1985. The song "Thy Word" is based on Psalm 119:105.

In 2007, Straight Ahead was reissued and digitally remastered by Grant's new record label, EMI/Sparrow Records. The remastered edition is labeled with a "Digitally Remastered" logo in the 'gutter' on the CD front.

Straight Ahead was the first Christian album to chart on the Billboard 200 chart. A&M reissued it in 1985, just as Grant was appearing on the Grammy Awards performing "Angels".

Track listing

Personnel 

 Amy Grant – lead vocals, backing vocals (1, 5, 9, 10)
 Robbie Buchanan – Roland Jupiter 8 (1, 2, 5), acoustic piano (2, 3, 8), synthesizers (4), keyboards (6, 7), arrangements (6), Fender Rhodes (7, 9)
 Michael W. Smith – keyboards (1-5, 8, 9, 10), Yamaha GS2 (1, 2, 3, 8), acoustic piano (4, 5, 9, 10)
 Alan Steinberger – additional synthesizers (1, 5, 6, 9), synthesizers (10)
 Shane Keister – additional synthesizers (2, 5, 8), synthesizers (3), organ (4)
 Gary Chapman – backing vocals (1, 4, 5, 9), guitar (4), guitar solo (4)
 Jon Goin – electric guitar (1), "fly" guitar (1), guitar (2, 3, 4, 6-10)
 Dann Huff – guitar solo (1), guitar (9)
 Dean Parks – guitar (7)
 Mike Brignardello – bass (1-4, 6-10)
 Andy Widders-Ellis – stick bass (3)
 Duncan Mullins – bass (4)
 Paul Leim – drums (1-4, 6-9)
 Kenny Malone – drums (10)
 Lenny Castro – percussion (1, 7, 9)
 Farrell Morris – percussion (8, 10)
 Alan Moore – string arrangements (2, 8)
 Donna McElroy – backing vocals (1, 2, 4, 5, 9)
 Kim Fleming – backing vocals (1, 4, 5, 9)
 Gary Pigg – backing vocals (2, 3)
 Debrorah Black – backing vocals (3)
 Bill Champlin – backing vocals (3)
 Tamara Champlin – backing vocals (3)
 Carmen Twillie – backing vocals (3)
 Marty McCall – backing vocals (3)
 Leann Jones – backing vocals (5)
 Curt Lyles – backing vocals (5)
 Mark Mason – backing vocals (5)
 Steve George – backing vocals (6)
 Richard Page – backing vocals (6)
 Thomas Cain – backing vocals (6)
 Chris Harris – backing vocals (7)
 Billy Sprague – backing vocals (7)
 David Thornton – backing vocals (7)
 Ron Downey – backing vocals (10)

Production

 Brown Bannister – producer
 Michael Blanton – executive producer
 Dan Harrell – executive producer
 Gary Chapman – executive producer
 Jack Joseph Puig – engineer
 Jim Baird – additional engineer
 Kevin Burns – additional engineer
 Gene Eichelberger – additional engineer
 Steven Ford – additional engineer
 Jerry Mahler – additional engineer
 Daniel Garcia – additional engineer
 Dennis Hill – design
 Mike Borum – photography
 Aaron Rapoport – photography

Music videos 

Music videos were released for "Angels" in 1984 and "It's Not a Song" in 1985.

Charts

Weekly charts

Year-end charts

End-of-decade charts

Certifications and sales

Accolades
GMA Dove Awards

Grammy Awards

References

Amy Grant albums
1984 albums
Albums produced by Brown Bannister
Myrrh Records albums